Dallas Taliaferro Taylor (born May 17, 1980) is an American musician who is the vocalist for the heavy metal band Maylene and the Sons of Disaster. He is the former vocalist and founder of the American rock band Underoath. He performed on three Underoath albums: Act of Depression, Cries of the Past, and The Changing of Times. In 2003, Dallas left Underoath, and was replaced by Spencer Chamberlain. He was born in Ocala, Florida.

Although no longer a member, Dallas has said in an interview that he is very good friends with the Underoath lead vocalist Chamberlain and was in a video with some Underoath members having fun at a recording studio in Atlanta, Georgia.

In mid- to late-2004 Dallas re-emerged with a new band, Maylene and the Sons of Disaster. They released an album, Maylene and the Sons of Disaster on October 25, 2005, and signed with Mono Vs Stereo. After the release, Maylene and the Sons of Disaster signed to Ferret Records.

Dallas has been quoted as saying, "I am so fed up with people acting like cowards, and so tired of the many things I've lived for in the past. I feel like it's time to get back to where I was when I was young.  This band is proud of who we are as people, what we believe, and where we come from. I feel like so much of music today, especially those who come from a Christian background, spend so much time hiding who they really are, or being ashamed of their beliefs, trying to be 'scene' or to sell records.  I want every kid to know I am not going to change who I really am to sell records. I mean, I absolutely hate shoving things down people's throats, but hiding who you are is just as bad."

Dallas was part of a two-person piano-based side project, The Everett, with his long-time friend Patrick Copeland from The Glorious Unseen. The Everett recorded a four song EP, Destination, that is no longer available.

In 2013, Taylor started a project with Matt Clark (ex-Underoath, Maylene, Sleeping by the Riverside), Adam Salaga (ex-xDisciplex A.D., ex-Jesus Wept), and Sean Sundy (ex-xDisciplex A.D., ex-Jesus Wept) called Riot Head. They have released three tracks and have mainly remained inactive.

Taylor is currently the bass player for Birmingham, Alabama punk-influenced band ZEAL, featuring Taylor on bass and close friend  Michael "Frog" Ray on vocals. They are joined by band mates from the popular Birmingham punk rock band Justify These Scars ( Andrew Balogh), and their first show was with He Is Legend.  Their second show was with punk legends The Murder Junkies (of GG Allin fame).

In the 2015 release of Joe Dirt 2: Beautiful Loser, Dallas plays the role of Lucky Louie.

On August 2, 2016, Taylor was hospitalized for a serious ATV accident in which he suffered a severe brain injury and trauma to the carotid artery. As of 2018, Taylor is still recovering from the accident, having had surgeries to recover his adrenal gland and the sight in his left eye.

Dallas' wife filed for divorce after several years of marriage and the birth of their son.

Bands
Current
 Maylene and the Sons of Disaster - vocals (2004–present)
 ZEAL - bass (2015–present)
 Riot Head - vocals (2013–present)
Former
 Underoath - vocals (1997-2003)
 Everret - vocals

Discography
Underoath
Act of Depression (1999)
Cries of the Past (2000)
The Changing of Times (2002)
Maylene and the Sons of Disaster
Maylene and the Sons of Disaster (2005)
II (2007)
The Day Hell Broke Loose at Sicard Hollow (2007)
III (2009)
Where the Saints Roam (2010)
IV (2011)

Videography

As musician 
Underøath
 "When the Sun Sleeps" - The Changing of Times (2002, Solid State Records)

Maylene and the Sons of Disaster
 "Tough As John Jacobs" - Maylene and the Sons of Disaster (2005, Mono Vs Stereo)
 "Dry the River" - II (2007, Ferret Records)
 "Darkest of Kin" - II (2007, Ferret Records)
 "The Day Hell Broke Loose at Sicard Hollow" - II (2007, Ferret Records)
 "Raised by the Tide" - II (2009, Ferret Records)
 "Step Up (I'm on It)" - III (2009, Ferret Records)
 "Listen Close" - III (2011, Ferret Records)
 "Open Your Eyes" - IV (2012, Ferret Records)

As actor 
 Rick in Revelation Road: The Black Rider (2014)
 Lucky Louie in Joe Dirt 2: Beautiful Loser (2015)
 Officer Cahill in The Possession Experiment (2016)

References 

1980 births
American heavy metal bass guitarists
American heavy metal keyboardists
American heavy metal singers
American rock guitarists
American male bass guitarists
Living people
Singers from Florida
American performers of Christian music
Musicians from Ocala, Florida
Guitarists from Florida
Underoath members
21st-century American singers
21st-century American bass guitarists
21st-century American male singers